Serrodes partita, the catapult moth, is a moth of the family Erebidae. The species was first described by Johan Christian Fabricius in 1775. It is found in western, eastern, central and southern Africa, India, Indonesia (Borneo, Java) and Sri Lanka.

Description
The wingspan of the adults is approximately 60 mm. Head, thorax and forewings dark or red or greyish brown. Forewings with a sub-basal dark red-brown spot on the costa, with a line from its lower edge. A similar antemedial spot and large lunule found below the cell with a highly excurved line from its lower edge. Reniform broken up into a number of tessellated spots with pale edges, and with rufous marks on the costa above it. A double straight postmedial line angled below the costa. Abdomen and hindwings are fuscous. Hindwings have traces of a medial pale line. Cilia paler at apex and anal angle.

They feed on plants such as Prunus persica, Sapindus saponaria, Sapindus trifoliatus, Pappea capensis, Sapindus saponica, Grewia occidentalis, Citrus, Deinbollia oblongifolia, Acacia, Deinbollia pinnata, Eucalyptus blobulus, and Leptospermum laevigatum.

See also
Cutworm

References

Serrodes
Moths described in 1775
Moths of Cape Verde
Moths of Africa
Moths of Réunion
Taxa named by Johan Christian Fabricius